Dirty Work is a 1934 British comedy crime film directed by Tom Walls and starring Ralph Lynn, Gordon Harker, Robertson Hare and Basil Sydney. It was based on Dirty Work, one of the Aldwych Farces, by Ben Travers, which had some of the same cast members. The film was made at the Lime Grove Studios with sets designed by the art director Alfred Junge.

Plot
A private detective is hired to protect expensive jewelry.

Cast
 Ralph Lynn as Jimmy Milligan
 Gordon Harker as Nettle
 Robertson Hare as Clement Peck
 Lilian Bond as Evie Wynne
 Basil Sydney as Hugh Stafford
 Margaretta Scott as Leonora Stafford
 Cecil Parker as Gordon Bray
 Gordon James as Toome
 Peter Gawthorne as Inspector Barlow
 Norma Varden as Tiara customer 
 Percy Walsh as Customer with umbrella

References

Bibliography
 Low, Rachael. Filmmaking in 1930s Britain. George Allen & Unwin, 1985.
 Wood, Linda. British Films, 1927-1939. British Film Institute, 1986.

External links

1934 films
British crime comedy films
Films directed by Tom Walls
1930s crime comedy films
Films set in London
Gainsborough Pictures films
Films shot at Lime Grove Studios
British black-and-white films
Films scored by Jack Beaver
1934 comedy films
1930s English-language films
1930s British films